Epiphanny Prince (born January 11, 1988) is a Russian-American professional basketball player for the New York Liberty of the Women's National Basketball Association (WNBA) and for Galatasaray of Turkey as well as the Russia women's national basketball team.

She is best known for scoring 113 points for Murry Bergtraum in a high-school game in 2006, breaking a girls' national prep record previously held by Hall of Famer Cheryl Miller. She participated in the 2006 Women's Basketball Coaches Association (WBCA) and McDonald's High School All-America Games.

Career

Overseas
In June, 2009, Prince announced plans to leave Rutgers after only three years to play professional basketball in Europe for a year. According to The New York Times, Prince was only 10 units from earning a degree in criminal justice and African-American studies and planned to complete her degree during the summer of 2009. Her announcement was not binding until she signed with an agent; in August, Prince signed with Wasserman Media Group. Prince initially joined Russian team Spartak Moscow, then Turkish team Botaş Spor, before the 2010 WNBA Draft.

In 2015, Prince moved to Dynamo Kursk in the European League. Their team won the 2017 Euroleague.

On 31 December 2022, she signed with Galatasaray of the Turkish Women's Basketball Super League (TKBL).

WNBA career
On February 16, 2015, the Chicago Sky traded Prince to the New York Liberty for Cappie Pondexter.

In 2019, Prince was signed as a late season addition to the Las Vegas Aces.

In the WNBA, she averaged 27.5 minutes per game, 37.3% three-point field goals, and 13.9 PPG through 2016.

National team career
In 2010, she was granted Russian citizenship. She was not on the roster during the 2011 European Championships, nor did she compete for Russia during the 2012 Olympics in London. 

Prince played as a point guard for the Russian national team in the European Championships of 2013, where the team finished in 13th place.

Career statistics

WNBA

Regular season

|-
| style="text-align:left;"| 2010
| style="text-align:left;"| Chicago
| 34 || 2 || 19.6 || .427 || .338 || .784 || 2.0 || 2.7 || 1.6 || 0.1 || 1.8 || 9.8
|-
| style="text-align:left;"| 2011
| style="text-align:left;"| Chicago
| 34 || 27 || 29.4 || .375 || .373 || .804 || 2.1 || 3.0 || 2.3 || 0.4 || 1.7 || 13.6
|-
| style="text-align:left;"| 2012
| style="text-align:left;"| Chicago
| 26 || 25 || 30.0 || .442 || .407 || .899 || 3.5 || 3.1 || 1.8 || 0.3 || 2.0 || 18.1
|-
| style="text-align:left;"| 2013
| style="text-align:left;"| Chicago
| 31 || 31 || 30.0 || .376 || .396 || .900 || 2.7 || 3.0 || 1.6 || 0.4 || 1.4 || 15.0
|-
| style="text-align:left;"| 2014
| style="text-align:left;"| Chicago
| 26 || 24 || 32.3 || .383 || .327 || .876 || 3.0 || 3.8 || 1.9 || 0.4 || 1.8 || 15.0
|-
| style="text-align:left;"| 2015
| style="text-align:left;"| New York
| 24 || 23 || 28.6 || .467 || .356 || .900 || 2.9 || 3.4 || 2.0 || 0.2 || 1.6 || 15.0
|-
| style="text-align:left;"| 2016
| style="text-align:left;"| New York
| 6 || 0 || 13.8 || .400 || .364 || 1.000 || 1.5 || 0.7 || 0.3 || 0.0 || 0.3 || 5.2
|-
| style="text-align:left;"| 2017
| style="text-align:left;"| New York
| 28 || 25 || 26.8 || .401 || .344 || .878 || 3.6 || 2.9 || 1.3 || 0.3 || 1.3 || 12.0
|-
| style="text-align:left;"| 2018
| style="text-align:left;"| New York
| 16 || 12 || 19.1 || .393 || .419 || .875 || 1.6 || 1.7 || 0.9 || 0.0 || 1.1 || 8.4
|-
| style="text-align:left;"| 2019
| style="text-align:left;"| Las Vegas
| 3 || 0 || 9.3 || .500 || .429 || – || 0.7 || 1.0 || 0.3 || 0.3 || 0.0 || 4.3
|-
|style="text-align:left;background:#afe6ba;"| 2020†
| style="text-align:left;"| Seattle
| 15 || 0 || 12.7 || .386 || .333 || .846 || 1.2 || 1.4 || 0.4 || 0.1 || 0.8 || 4.3
|-
| style="text-align:left;"| 2021
| style="text-align:left;"| Seattle
| 29 || 2 || 14.3 || .439 || .500 || .897 || 1.6 || 1.7 || 0.7 || 0.2 || 0.9 || 5.8
|-
| style="text-align:left;"| 2022
| style="text-align:left;"| Seattle
| 33 || 0 || 12.3 || .355 || .356 || .840 || 1.0 || 1.8 || 0.6 || 0.1 || 0.5 || 3.9
|-
| style='text-align:left;'| Career
| style='text-align:left;'| 13 years, 4 teams
| 305 || 171 || 23.2 || .406 || .377 || .864 || 2.3 || 2.6 || 1.4 || 0.2 || 1.3 || 11.0

Postseason

|-
|-
| style="text-align:left;"| 2013
| style="text-align:left;"| Chicago
| 2 || 2 || 33.5 || .333 || .286 || 1.000 || 1.5 || 0.5 || 1.5 || 0.0 || 0.0 || 14.5
|-
| style="text-align:left;"| 2014
| style="text-align:left;"| Chicago
| 9 || 9 || 29.1 || .296 || .273 || .800 || 3.4 || 2.1 || 1.6 || 0.8 || 1.4 || 9.2
|-
| style="text-align:left;"| 2015
| style="text-align:left;"| New York
| 6 || 6 || 32.7 || .359 || .379 || .750 || 2.8 || 3.0 || 1.2 || 0.3 || 1.8 || 13.2
|-
| style="text-align:left;"| 2016
| style="text-align:left;"| New York
| 1 || 0 || 17.0 || .500 || .667 || 1.000 || 3.0 || 3.0 || 0.0 || 0.0 || 0.0 || 12.0
|-
| style="text-align:left;"| 2017
| style="text-align:left;"| New York
| 1 || 1 || 35.0 || .444 || .286 || 1.000 || 5.0 || 2.0 || 1.0 || 0.0 || 2.0 || 12.0
|-
| style="text-align:left;"| 2019
| style="text-align:left;"| Las Vegas
| 3 || 0 || 1.7 || .333 || – || – || 0.0 || 0.0 || 0.0 || 0.0 || 0.0 || 0.7
|-
|style="text-align:left;background:#afe6ba;"| 2020†
| style="text-align:left;"| Seattle
| 5 || 0 || 13.0 || .471 || .364 || .833 || 0.8 || 2.2 || 1.0 || 0.0 || 0.4 || 5.0
|-
| style="text-align:left;"| 2021
| style="text-align:left;"| Seattle
| 1 || 0 || 9.0 || .000 || .000 || – || 0.0 || 1.0 || 0.0 || 1.0 || 2.0 || 0.0
|-
| style="text-align:left;"| 2022
| style="text-align:left;"| Seattle
| 6 || 0 || 5.0 || .200 || .000 || – || 0.3 || 0.3 || 0.2 || 0.0 || 0.2 || 0.3
|-
| align="left" | Career
| align="left" | 9 years, 4 teams
| 34 || 18 || 20.3 || .339 || .319 || .842 || 1.9 || 1.7 || 0.9 || 0.3 || 0.9 || 7.2
|}

College
Source

Awards and honors
The Daily News Player of the Year (2004)
Student Sports Sophomore of the Year (2004)
USA Today All-USA
Second Team (2006)
Parade Magazine All-American
First Team (2006)
Second Team (2005)
Street & Smith’s All-American
First Team (2006)
First Team (2005)

See also
List of basketball players who have scored 100 points in a single game

References

External links
Rutgers Scarlet Knights bio 
A Funeral For Sportsmanship

1988 births
Living people
American women's basketball players
Russian women's basketball players
American emigrants to Russia
All-American college women's basketball players
American expatriate basketball people in Turkey
Basketball players from New York City
Botaş SK players
Chicago Sky draft picks
Chicago Sky players
Galatasaray S.K. (women's basketball) players
LGBT basketball players
LGBT people from New York (state)
Lesbian sportswomen
McDonald's High School All-Americans
Murry Bergtraum High School alumni
Naturalised citizens of Russia
New York Liberty players
Parade High School All-Americans (girls' basketball)
Point guards
Russian people of African-American descent
Rutgers Scarlet Knights women's basketball players
Seattle Storm players
Shooting guards
Women's National Basketball Association All-Stars